Attiki is a metro station in Athens, Greece. The station opened in 1885. It was the main hub of Attica Railways, a metre gauge network connecting downtown Athens with the mining town of Lavrion and the northern suburbs of Marousi and Kifissia. Lavrion trains were diverted to the SPAP line in 1929 and passenger services to Kifissia were suspended in 1938.

In 1949 the station was converted to standard gauge and became the northern terminus of the line of Hellenic Electric Railways. The new electrified line was again extended to Kifissia, leaving Attiki as an intermediate station. Two underground platforms were added in 2000 for Athens Metro Line 2 trains. The station entrance and the Line 1 platforms were renovated extensively in 2003–2004.

Part of the old station is used as a trolleybus garage by OSY.

Today the station is served by STASY. There are train storage and a service connection between the Line 1 and Line 2.

See also
 Lavrion Square-Strofyli railway
 Athens–Lavrion Railway

References

External links 
Official Website

Athens Metro stations
Railway stations opened in 1949
Railway stations opened in 2000
1949 establishments in Greece